

Active airlines 
This is a list of actives airlines (April 2015) which have an Air Operator Certificate issued by the Civil Aviation Authority  of Uruguay.

References

See also 
List of airlines
List of defunct airlines of Uruguay
List of airlines of the Americas

</noinclude>

 
Airlines
Uruguay
Airlines
Uruguay